Tillandsia fendleri is a species of flowering plant in the genus Tillandsia. This species is native to the West Indies (Cuba, Hispaniola, Jamaica, Trinidad) and South America (Bolivia, Guyana, Colombia, Peru, northern Brazil, Venezuela and Ecuador).

Two varieties are recognized:

Tillandsia fendleri var. fendleri - most of species range
Tillandsia fendleri var. reducta (L.B.Sm.) L.B.Sm. - Venezuela, Colombia, Ecuador, Peru

References

fendleri
Flora of the Caribbean
Flora of South America
Plants described in 1865
Flora without expected TNC conservation status